The Black Maternal Health Caucus is a caucus made up of mostly African-American members of the United States Congress. Congresswomen Alma Adams of North Carolina and Lauren Underwood of Illinois founded the caucus in April 2019 and currently serve as co-chairs.

Purpose 
The Black Maternal Health Caucus was founded to 'improve black maternal health outcomes,' with the founders citing statistics that the United States has the worst maternal death rates in the developed world, at 18 death per 100,00 live births, and with a higher rate among black women, at 40 deaths per 100,000 live births.

History 
Shortly after the formation of the Black Maternal Health Caucus, Senator Kamala Harris sponsored the Maternal CARE Act. If passed, the Maternal CARE Act would serve to reduce maternal mortality and morbidity by providing implicit bias training as a solution for addressing racial bias in health care. 

As of 2019, seventy-five members of the United States House of Representatives belong to the caucus, including support from Speaker of the United States House of Representatives Nancy Pelosi, House Majority Leader Steny Hoyer and other leaders within the Democratic caucus. 

In 2020, the COVID-19 pandemic in the United States highlighted racial disparities in healthcare. Many Black women requiring hospitalization were dying at alarming rates compared to other racial groups.

In 2021, an updated Momnibus was introduced. Sponsoring members of the House of Representatives of include: Sheila Jackson Lee, Nikema Williams, and Jamie Raskin. The term "Momnibus" is a word play on "omnibus," which is a single bill submitted to a legislature that combines several diverse matters.

Legislation 
In March 2020, Lauren Underwood introduced the Momnibus Package, "which would require the Centers for Disease Control and Prevention to publicly post data on COVID-19 and pregnancy, disaggregated by race and ethnicity".

See also 
 Black maternal mortality in the United States
 African Americans in the United States Congress

References 

2019 establishments in the United States
Post–civil rights era in African-American history
African-American members of the United States Congress
African-American members of the United States House of Representatives
Caucuses of the United States Congress
Politics and race in the United States
Maternal health
Maternity in the United States
Race and health in the United States